Radio Navtarang is a commercial, private owned Hindi FM radio station in Fiji. It is owned by the Communications Fiji Limited (CFL), company which also owns FM96-Fiji, Viti FM, Legend FM and Radio Sargam. Radio Navatarang is streaming in three frequencies: 101FM in Suva, Navua, Nausori, Labasa, Nadi & Lautoka, 100.8FM in Savusavu, Coral Coast, Ba & Tavua and on 101.4FM in Rakiraki. Radio Navtarang can also be accessed through online with the new website: https://navtarang.com.fj.

The station signed on the air on September 15, 1989 with the song “Haste Haste Kat Jaye Raste, Zindagi Younhee Chalti Rahe” from the movie Khoon Bhari Maang. Late Anirudh Diwakar (former announcer of Radio Fiji Two)and former programs director of Radio Sargam initiated Radio Navtarang with its unique form of program lineup-trend setting radio style, which was emulated by many other Hindi radio stations in Fiji, New Zealand, Australia, Canada and United States of America.

Recent research done by Tebbutt Media Survey revealed that 38% of Fiji’s Indian population listen to Radio Navtarang out of six Hindi radio station in Fiji, making Radio Navtarang the most listened to Hindi radio station. The main competitors of Radio Navtarang are Fiji Broadcasting Corporation owned Radio Fiji Two and Mirchi FM. Today, Radio Navtarang is the leading Hindi Radio Station in the Pacific.

Program line-up
Radio Navtarang’s programme lineup is as follows
 6.00am - 9am Breakfast Show : Satya Nand and Anamika Singh
 9am - 2pm Midmorning Show: Jessica
 2pm - 7pm Drive Time: Rowdy Naman
 5pm - 6pm Masala Mix: Satya, Naman, Jai, Jessica, Anamika
 7pm - 12am The Tonight Show: Atishwar
 12am-5.30am Khwabe-e-Manzil: Pritisha, Anishma, Aniketh, Shresta
Thursday 7pm-12am Loveline: Avishay
 Saturday 6pm - 8pm Movie Magic & Bollywood Biography: Atishwar, Prashneel
 Saturday Night Hangama 8pm - 12am: Sarvesh, Atishwar, Prashneel
 Sunday 9-11am Top 20 Countdown: Naman Narayan
 Sunday 11-12pm Navtarang's Radio Shopping: Naman Narayan
 Sunday 12-1pm Top of the Pops: Prashneel
 Sunday 3-5pm- Movers & Shakers: Satya, Prashneel
 Sunday Sukoon 7-12pm- Kaajal

Satya Nand is the station’s current Senior Content Director.

Current Radio Personalities

 Satya Nand  - Programs Director
 Rowdy Naman
 Janice 
 Atishwar 
 Prashneel
 Avishay
 Rahul
 Jessica
 Pritisha
 Anishma
 Anamika
 Arshneel
 Aniketh
 Shresta
 Kaajal

Former radio jockeys
Some of the famous radio jockeys that have worked with Radio Navtarang include;

 Late Anirudh Diwakar
 Veena Bhatnagar
 Sashi Kanta
 Vijay Verma
 Ranjana Kumar
 Roshni Mala
 Sneh Chaudhry
 Rakesh Chand
 Shalen Sharma
 Saten Sharma
 Sangeeta Mani
 Pawan Rekha
 Shammi Lochan
 Renuka Goundar
 Charles Wakeham
 Lawrence Singh
 Sanjyotika Lata
 Jasmine Khan
 Jai Prasad
 Angeleen Sharma
 DJ Sarra
 Akaushal kumar

References

Hindi-language radio stations
Radio stations in Fiji
Hindi Radio in Fiji